Mistick, Massachusetts may refer to:

 An old name for part of Medford, Massachusetts
 An old name for part of Malden, Massachusetts
 The nearby Mystic River